Elizabeth Triegaardt (born 28 September 1946) is a South African ballet dancer, now retired. She is professor emerita of the University of Cape Town School of Dance and an honorary executive director of the Cape Town City Ballet.

Early life, education, and training 
Elizabeth Eva Triegaardt was born in Pretoria (now Tshwane), the executive capital of South Africa, located in the northern province of Transvaal (now Gauteng). Her parents were descendants of the Voortrekkers who left the Cape Colony in the 1830s and 1840s and moved northeastward in the Great Trek to settle lands in the interior of southern Africa. The Boer republic established on the Highveld across the Vaal River was called Transvaal, which became a province of South Africa in 1910.

Elizabeth was raised to be bilingual in Afrikaans and English. In 1950, at age 3½, she began her dance training in a class for toddlers in Pretoria. Later, in nearby Johannesburg, she trained with the leading dance teachers in the city, studying ballet with Ivy Conmee and Marjorie Sturman and Spanish dance with Mercedes Molina. She matriculated at Hyde Park High School in Johannesburg and graduated from the University of Cape Town, with a bachelor of science degree in pure mathematics, in 1966. That same year she was awarded a Solo Seal by examiners from the Royal Academy of Dancing. She was then 20 years old. In addition to her concentration on ballet, she was an active member of the Spanish Dance Society and the Imperial Society of Teachers of Dance (Greek).

Performing career 
In 1967, Triegaardt joined CAPAB Ballet, named for the Cape Performing Arts Board and formerly known as the University of Cape Town Ballet. She became a principal dancer and later, in 1971, ballet mistress of the company. With it, she toured extensively to major cities in South Africa and South West Africa (now Namibia). Among the many roles she performed until her retirement from the stage in 1990 are the following. 
 1967. Swan Lake, produced by David Poole, music by Pyotr Ilyich Tchaikovsky, Role: Odette/Odile, partnered by Eduard Greyling.
 1968. La Famille: The Intimate Recollections of an Elderly Aunt, choreography by Dulcie Howes, music by William Walton. Roles: Hortense and Waltz, partnered by Keith Mackintosh.
 1968. The Two Pigeons, choreography by Frederick Ashton, music by André Messager. Role: The Young Girl.
 1969. La Bayadère, produced by Gary Burne, music by Ludwig Minkus. Role: Nikiya, partnered by Eduard Greyling.
 1970. The Sleeping Beauty, produced by David Poole, music by Pyotr Ilyich Tchaikovsky. Role: Aurora, partnered by Eduard Greyling.
 1971. Transfigured Night, choreography by Frank Staff, music by Arnold Schoenberg. Role: Elder Sister.
 1971. Missa Flamenca, choreography by Marina Keet, music by Manuel Lillo Torregrosa. Role: The Gloria.
 1972. Giselle, produced by David Poole, music by Adolphe Adam. Role: Myrtha, Queen of the Wilis.
 1973. Pictures at an Exhibition, choreography by Audrey King, music by Modest Mussorgsky. Role: Baba Yaga.
 1973. John the Baptist, choreography by Veronica Paeper, music by Ernest Bloch. Role: Herodias.
 1973. The Rain Queen, conception by Frank Staff, choreography by David Poole, music by Graham Newcater. Role: Princess, partnered by Eduard Greyling and Keith Macintosh.
 1974. The Firebird, choreography by David Poole, music by Igor Stravinsky. Role: The Firebird, partnered by Eduard Greyling and Keith Macintosh.
 1975. Cinderella, choreography by Veronica Paeper, music by Sergei Prokofiev. Role: Fairy Godmother.
 1977. Raymonda, choreography by Alfred Rodrigues, music by Alexander Glazunov. Role: Raymonda, partnered by John Simons.
 1979. Concerto for Charlie, choreography by Veronica Paeper, music by Dmitri Shostakovich. Role: Charlie Girl.
 1980. Drei Diere (Three Beasts), choreography by Veronica Paeper, music by Peter Klatzow. Role: Sphinx.
 1982. Orpheus in the Underworld, choreography by Veronica Paeper, music by Jacques Offenbach. Role: Hera.
 1983. Undine, choreography by Veronica Paeper, music by Claude Debussy. Role: Undine.
 1984. Spartacus, choreography by Veronica Paeper, music by Aram Khatchaturian. Role: Aegina.

Later life
In 1986, while still performing with CAPAB Ballet, Triegaardt was appointed director of the University of Cape Town School of Dance. In addition to strengthening the program of training in classical ballet, she introduced contemporary dance and African dance majors to reflect the diversity of theatrical dance forms that had emerged in cities and towns around the country. The degree program offered under her aegis was the first one recognized in South Africa. From 1997 to 2004, as the executive chairman of the Cape Town City Ballet, she was an effective advocate for preserving the classical repertory and for encouraging the work of South African choreographers. In 2011, she retired from her post as head of the university dance department but continued to host a weekly program on Fine Music Radio. Called Invitation to the Dance, it was for many years a popular Sunday program with radio listeners in Cape Town.

Awards 
In 1975, Triegaardt received the Nederburg Prize for her contribution to ballet, with specific mention of her performance of the Lilac Fairy in David Poole's production of The Sleeping Beauty. In 2003, she received an award from the Western Cape premier, Ebrahim Rasool, for meritorious service to the arts in the province. She received a second award from the Western Cape Department of Cultural Affairs and Sport in 2009. In July 2019 Elizabeth Triegaardt received her Fellowship Award for lifetime services to classical dance and the Royal Academy of Dance, awarded by Dame Darcy Bussell at the graduation ceremony for the Academy in London.

Personal life
Triegaardt married Dr. Gwyn Griffiths in April 1971. Throughout their joint professional careers, they resided in a pleasant suburb of Cape Town, at the base of fabled Table Mountain on the shore of Table Bay.

References 

1946 births
Living people
South African ballerinas
University of Cape Town alumni
Academic staff of the University of Cape Town